"My Kind of Lady" was the second single from Supertramp's 1982 album …Famous Last Words…. The song is a '50's-style mid-tempo love ballad; it peaked at #16 for USA Billboard Adult Contemporary and #31 for USA Billboard pop singles. The lead and backing vocals were all sung by Davies, who harmonizes with himself by switching between his natural voice and a falsetto vocal. The echo-treated and natural sounding voice was sung in Davies' baritone. The falsetto passages were double tracked and mixed with a phaser. Despite being released as a single, the track was not performed live.

The song's writing credits are given to Rick Davies and Roger Hodgson, members of the band, although as indicated on the album sleeve, it is a Davies composition. Like John Lennon and Paul McCartney and Mick Jagger and Keith Richards, Davies and Hodgson joined writer's credits from 1974 until 1983, when Hodgson left Supertramp to pursue a solo career.

The song was the last single released during original member Hodgson's tenure.

Cash Box predicted that the song would be successful based on the "minimal production, Rick Davies’ trademark falsetto and a catchy sax solo."  Billboard praised the song's "sense of fun" and said it is a throwback to 1956 with "chunky piano, bleating sax, and rhymes you can quote before you've heard them."

Track listings

7" vinyl single

Music video

For the video for "My Kind of Lady" was directed by Kenny Ortega. The band depicted themselves as a 1950s doo-wop group and 50s rock band. To do so, the band members shaved off their trademark beards and moustaches and cut their hair short. Because he showed up late for the shoot, Hodgson is not in the doo-wop sequences.

The video had two different endings. One was a black and white ending with the band playing and the other was in colour with a different angle of the band playing at the end.

Chart performance

Personnel

Rick Davies – lead and backing vocals, piano
Roger Hodgson – guitar
Dougie Thomson – bass guitar
John Helliwell – baritone saxophone, alto saxophone, synthesizers
Bob Siebenberg – drums

References

Supertramp songs
1982 songs
1983 singles
Rock ballads
Songs written by Rick Davies
Songs written by Roger Hodgson
A&M Records singles